Bucculatrix atrosignata is a moth in the family Bucculatricidae. It was described by Annette Frances Braun in 1963. It is found in North America, where it has been recorded from Utah.

The wingspan is 6.5–7 mm. The forewings are white. The markings are formed by groups of broadly black-tipped scales and a few greyish scales along the basal third of the costa. The hindwings are white.

References

Natural History Museum Lepidoptera generic names catalog

Bucculatricidae
Moths described in 1963
Moths of North America
Taxa named by Annette Frances Braun